El Boldo Airport ,  is an airport serving Cauquenes, a city in the Maule Region of Chile.

See also

Transport in Chile
List of airports in Chile

References

External links
OpenStreetMap - El Boldo
OurAirports - El Boldo
FallingRain - El Boldo Airport

Airports in Maule Region